Gipsy is an unincorporated community in Indiana County, in the U.S. state of Pennsylvania.

History
Gipsy was founded after 1885 in a coal mining district. A post office called Gipsy has been in operation since 1891.

References

Unincorporated communities in Indiana County, Pennsylvania
Unincorporated communities in Pennsylvania